Patlada Kulphakthanapat (born 15 September 1992) is a Thai model and beauty pageant titleholder who won Elite Model Look Thailand 2014 contest, and was crowned 1st Runner-up Miss Thailand World 2016 and she will represent Thailand at the Miss World 2017 pageants.

Personal life
She recently graduated with a degree in Communication Arts from Siam University.

Pageantry

Miss Thailand World 2016
Kulphakthanapat was crowned 1st Runner-up Miss Thailand World 2016 and then competed at Miss World 2017 in Shenzhen Dayun Arena, Shenzhen, China PR.

Miss World 2017
Kulphakthanapat represented Thailand at Miss World 2017 where Stephanie Del Valle of Puerto Rico crowned her successor at the end of the event.  She is unplaced.

References

External links
 www.missthailandworld.net Miss Thailand World Official Website
 

1992 births
Living people
Patlada Kulphakthanapat
Patlada Kulphakthanapat
Miss Thailand World
Miss World 2017 delegates